The Comic Bible stand UP and read THIS is a comedy news magazine covering all aspects of the comedy and entertainment industry in the U.S. and worldwide. It features comedy and entertainment news, insider information, global comedy event coverage, reviews, tips, listings, resources, and interviews with celebrities, comedians, and industry professionals. The Comic Bible magazine was founded in 1994 by MaryAnn Pierro and is now published by PMS Productions, Inc..

Overview
The Comic Bible magazine gained immediate recognition in the early 1990s as the only publication dedicated entirely to the comedy industry. It provided comedy entertainment coverage and resources for the industry. The first issues of the Comic Bible appeared in booklet form and contained comedy club listings, basic tips and advice. It then became a 5.5 x 8.5 inch perfect bound publication (Library of Congress , 1997). The Comic Bible Magazine also sponsored and produced several high-profile comedy events. Under the banner of its “Laughter for a Good Cause” program, The Comic Bible Magazine brought awareness to charitable causes. In association with Caroline's Comedy Club, NYC, The Comic Bible Magazine also produced “Sketch Off” sketch comedy competition, and the “Funny Shorts Film Festival.” The events also featured live sketches and short films produced by The Comic Bible. In 2000, the print publication expanded into a larger 8.5 x 11 inch format and ‘The Comic Bible’ became a registered trademark (USTPO serial #76050399).

In 2010, PMS Productions branded Comic Bible Books and released the first of a four volume series: “Celebrity Comics Babble – A Romp Through a Red Carpet of Interviews”. This volume contains over thirty celebrity interviews compiled from The Comic Bible Magazine.

Current
Returning in 2011 with a new 136-page publication printed quarterly, The Comic Bible magazine (bipad: 26506) remains dedicated to the comedy industry. It continues to feature regular columns from renowned comedy experts and professionals in comedy-related fields. Industry resources, coverage of worldwide comedy events, comedy listings (comedy clubs, festivals), reviews, interviews with comedy talent and professional profiles are also in each issue of The Comic Bible Magazine. [see "Celebrity Interviews" below].

Extending its presence to the internet, The Comic Bible magazine offers online content with a content-driven blog and an online video presence with Comic Bible TV. In 2011, The Comic Bible magazine released The Comic Bible Magazine app, containing resources and issue content from The Comic Bible magazine's back issue catalog. In 2012, the full version of each current issue also became available to the mobile market.

The Comic Bible magazine also takes an active role in supporting the comedy industry through media sponsorship of comedy events and productions worldwide.

Celebrity Interviews
(Partial List)
Bill Bailey "Dandelion MINDS" (Volume 4 Issue 2)
Lewis Black
Elayne Boosler
J. Anthony Brown "The J Spot" (Volume 4 Issue 1)
Kay Cannon "Brings a Little Hunk of 30 Rock" (Volume 4 Issue 1)
Darren Carter "The Scoop With..." (Volume 4 Issue 2)
Tommy Chong
Bobby Collins "Telling It Like It Is" (Volume 5 Issue 2)
Tommy Davidson
Chris D'Elia "From Stage to TV's Whitney" (Volume 5 Issue 1)
Travel Channel's Evan & Gareth "On Mancations" (Volume 4 Issue 1)
Judah Friedlander "World Champion" (Volume 4 Issue 2)
Rich Fulcher "Talks Words" (Volume 5 Issue 2)
Jim Gaffigan "Journeyman" (Volume 4 Issue 1)
Anne-Marie Johnson "SAG-AFTRA Merger: The Invisible Debate" (Volume 5 Issue 2)
Jo Koy "On Lights Out" (Volume 5 Issue 2)
Marc Maron "This is Him..." (Volume 5 Issue 1)
Heather McDonald "Always Having a Ball" (Volume 4 Issue 2)
Bonnie McFarlane
Tim Minchin "Behind the Mind Of" (Volume 5 Issue 1)
Jackie Monahan "Is an Alien" (Volume 4 Issue 1)
Tracy Morgan
Nyambi Nyambi "Loving Mike and Molly" (Volume 5 Issue 2)
Paul Provenza "In the Green Room" (Volume 4 Issue 1)
Ray Romano
Pauly Shore "Out of Weaseling...Into Vegas" (Volume 4 Issue 2)
Wanda Sykes
Alan Thicke "Still Booming" (Volume 5 Issue 1)
Patrick Warburton "The Busiest Actor in Hollywood?" (Volume 5 Issue 1)

References

Sources
http://www.myvirtualpaper.com/doc/West-end-Times/16.43westendtimes/2011070801/#8
http://www.humorthatworks.com/book-reviews/celebrity-comics-babble-book-review/
http://thecomicbible.com/About/aboutcomicbiblea.html
https://play.google.com/store/apps/details?id=com.appbuilder.u34604p175414&feature=more_from_developer#?t=W251bGwsMSwxLDEwMiwiY29tLmFwcGJ1aWxkZXIudTM0NjA0cDE3NTQxNCJd
http://www.shayne-michael.com/index.php?newsID=574
How to Be a Working Comic: An Insider's Guide to a Career in Stand-Up Comedy by Dave Schwensen

External links
Official website 

News magazines published in the United States
Quarterly magazines published in the United States
Satirical magazines published in the United States
Magazines established in 1994